California Spring, or Yellow Banks, is a spring at the headwaters of Evans Creek, in Val Verde County, 4.8 miles northeast of Comstock.

History
California Spring was a water stop on the San Antonio-El Paso Road, 15.73 miles northwest of Painted Caves and 2 miles southeast of Willow Spring another water stop on the old road.  Shallow wells were dug for easier access to the water.  A pool of water existed at the spring until the 1930s.  Now the channel is filled with gravel.

References

Bodies of water of Val Verde County, Texas
Springs of Texas
San Antonio–El Paso Road